Le nozze in villa (The Wedding in the Villa) is an opera buffa in two acts by Gaetano Donizetti, dating to early in his career.  Completed in 1819, it was premiered at the Teatro Vecchio in Mantua sometime during the carnival season of 1820-1821; the exact date is uncertain. The libretto by Bartolomeo Merelli is based on the play  by August von Kotzebue. The opera was a failure at its premiere, and has disappeared from performance since; save for a performance in Genoa in the spring of 1822 as I provinciali, ossia Le nozze in villa, no further mountings are known. Donizetti's autograph score has vanished, but an incomplete copy of the work, missing a quintet from Act II, exists in the library of the Conservatoire de Paris.

Merelli, in his Cenni biografici, blamed the failure of the work, despite "many successful numbers", on the "caprices and ill will of several of the singers, especially the prima donna".  Fanny Eckerlin sang the lead role in the premiere.

Characters

Sabina, a young woman (mezzo-soprano)
Trifoglio, schoolmaster (bass)
Claudio, a young man, well-off (tenor)
Don Petronio, Sabina's father (bass)
Anastasia (contralto)

Plot

The opera takes place in a small German town in the 18th century.

Sabina is in love with Claudio but courted by Trifoglio, to whom she has been promised in marriage by her father, Don Petronio. She carries with her a portrait of Claudio as a love token, but passes it off as being of the King; consequently, upon his appearance in the village her lover is treated as if he is royalty. After the usual misunderstandings, Trifoglio withdraws from contention when he discovers that Sabina has no dowry. As a result, Claudio wins the day, as he is a wealthy landowner and therefore agrees to give up the dowry.

Recordings

 A single excerpt may be found on an anthology released by Opera Rara.

 Donizetti: Le Nozze in Villa - World Premiere Recording; Conductor: Stefano Montanari with the Orchestra Gli Originali and Coro Donizetti Opera; singers, Gaia Petrone and Omar Montanari, on November 22, 2020 at the Festival Donizetti.  Label: Dynamic CDS7908.02, EAN 8007144079086

References

 

1819 operas
Operas by Gaetano Donizetti
Operas based on plays
Operas set in Germany
Opera buffa
Operas
Italian-language operas